The Virginia Commission for the Arts (VCA), is the state agency that supports the arts through funding from the Virginia General Assembly and the National Endowment for the Arts.

The Commission was created in 1968, is governed by 13 Commissioners appointed to five-year terms by the Governor and confirmed by the General Assembly of Virginia.

References

Virginia culture
State agencies of Virginia
Government agencies established in 1968
1968 establishments in Virginia